Filipowice may refer to the following places:
Filipowice, Kraków County in Lesser Poland Voivodeship (south Poland)
Filipowice, Proszowice County in Lesser Poland Voivodeship (south Poland)
Filipowice, Tarnów County in Lesser Poland Voivodeship (south Poland)